The 2022 DoorDash 250 was the twelfth stock car race of the 2022 NASCAR Camping World Truck Series, and the fifth iteration of the event. The race was held on Saturday, June 11, 2022, in Sonoma, California at Sonoma Raceway, a  permanent road course. The race took the scheduled 75 laps to complete. At race's end, Kyle Busch, driving for his own team, Kyle Busch Motorsports, put on a dominant performance, leading 45 laps for his 62nd career NASCAR Camping World Truck Series win, and his first of the season. To fill out the podium, Zane Smith of Front Row Motorsports, and Ty Majeski of ThorSport Racing, would finish 2nd and 3rd, respectively.

This was also the first NASCAR Camping World Truck Series race held at Sonoma Raceway for the first time since 1998.

Background 
Sonoma Raceway (originally known as Sears Point Raceway until 2002) is a road course and dragstrip located at Sears Point in the southern Sonoma Mountains of Sonoma County, California. It is host to one of the few NASCAR Cup Series races each year that are run on road courses. It has also played host to the IndyCar Series, the NHRA Camping World Drag Racing Series, and several other auto races and motorcycle races such as the American Federation of Motorcyclists series. Sonoma Raceway continues to host amateur, or club racing events with some open to the public. The largest such car club is the Sports Car Club of America.

Entry list 

 (R) denotes rookie driver.
 (i) denotes driver who are ineligible for series driver points.

Practice 
The only 50-minute practice session was held on Friday, June 10, at 3:05 PM PST.

Qualifying 
Qualifying was held on Saturday, June 11, at 10:05 AM PST. Since Sonoma Raceway is a road course, the qualifying system used is a two group system, with two rounds. Drivers will be separated into two groups, Group A and Group B. Each driver will have a lap to set a time. The fastest 5 drivers from each group will advance to the final round. Drivers will also have one lap to set a time. The fastest driver to set a time in the round will win the pole.

However, shortly after making the lap, he would spin in turn 10, and collect the tire barriers. Hocevar will move to a backup truck, with Ross Chastain taking over the pole position.

Full qualifying results

Race results 
Stage 1 Laps: 20

Stage 2 Laps: 25

Stage 3 Laps: 30

Notes

Standings after the race 

Drivers' Championship standings

Note: Only the first 10 positions are included for the driver standings.

References 

2022 NASCAR Camping World Truck Series
NASCAR races at Sonoma Raceway
DoorDash 250
DoorDash 250